The Melchior system, "a reference in all taxonomic courses", is a classification system detailing the taxonomic system of the Angiospermae according to A. Engler's Syllabus der Pflanzenfamilien (1964), also known as "modified or updated" Engler system.

The collaborators in orders (and some families) were the following:
 Hans Melchior in Casuarinales, Juglandales, Balanopales, Leitneriales, Salicales, Fagales, Urticales, Didiereaceae, Piperales, Aristolochiales, Guttiferales, Sarraceniales, Papaverales, Hydrostachyales, Podostemonales, Julianiales, Violales, Cucurbitales, Myrtiflorae, Umbelliflorae, Primulales, Tubiflorae, Plantaginales, Liliiflorae p. p., Spathiflorae and Microspermae.
 G. Buchheim in Proteales, Cactales, Magnoliales and Ranunculales.
 W. Schultze-Motel in Santalales, Balanophorales, Medusandrales, Rhamnales, Malvales, Diapensiales, Ericales and Cyperales.
 Th. Eckardt in Polygonales, Centrospermae, Batales, Plumbaginales, Helobiae, Triuridales and Pandanales.
 G. K. Schultze-Menz in Rosales.
 H. Scholz in Geraniales, Rutales, Sapindales and Celastrales.
 G. Wagenitz in Thymelaeales, Ebenales, Oleales, Gentianales, Dipsacales and Campanulales.
 U. Hamann in Cyanastraceae, Pontederiaceae, Philydraceae, Juncales, Bromeliales and Commelinales.
 E. Potztal in Graminales, Principes, Synanthae and Scitamineae.

Angiospermae

classis Monocotyledoneae

ordo Helobiae
subordo Alismatineae
Alismataceae
Butomaceae
subordo Hydrocharitineae
Hydrocharitaceae
subordo Scheuchzeriineae
Scheuchzeriaceae
subordo Potamogetonineae
Aponogetonaceae
Juncaginaceae
Potamogetonaceae
Najadaceae
Zannichelliaceae

ordo Triuridales
Triuridaceae

ordo Liliiflorae
subordo Liliineae
Liliaceae
Xanthorrhoeaceae
Stemonaceae
Agavaceae
Haemodoraceae
Cyanastraceae
Amaryllidaceae
Hypoxidaceae
Velloziaceae
Taccaceae
Dioscoreaceae
subordo Pontederiineae
Pontederiaceae
subordo Iridineae
Iridaceae
Geosiridaceae
subordo Burmanniineae
Burmanniaceae
Corsiaceae
subordo Philydrineae
Philydraceae

ordo Juncales
Juncaceae
Thurniaceae

ordo Bromeliales
Bromeliaceae

ordo Commelinales
subordo Commelinineae
Commelinaceae
Xyridaceae
Mayacaceae
Rapateaceae
subordo Eriocaulineae
Eriocaulaceae
subordo Restionineae
Restionaceae
Centrolepidaceae
subordo Flagellariineae
Flagellariaceae

ordo Graminales
Gramineae or Poaceae

ordo Principes
Palmae or Arecaceae

ordo Synanthae
Cyclanthaceae

ordo Spathiflorae
Araceae
Lemnaceae

ordo Pandanales
Pandanaceae
Sparganiaceae
Typhaceae

ordo Cyperales
Cyperaceae

ordo Scitamineae
Musaceae
Zingiberaceae
Cannaceae
Marantaceae
Lowiaceae

ordo Microspermae
Orchidaceae

classis Dicotyledoneae

subclassis Archychlamydeae

ordo Casuarinales
Casuarinaceae

ordo Juglandales
Myricaceae
Juglandaceae

ordo Balanopales
Balanopaceae

ordo Leitneriales
Leitneriaceae
Didymelaceae

ordo Salicales
Salicaceae

ordo Fagales
Betulaceae
Fagaceae

ordo Urticales
Rhoipteleaceae
Ulmaceae
Moraceae
Urticaceae
Eucommiaceae

ordo Proteales
Proteaceae

ordo Santalales
subordo Santalineae
Olacaceae
Dipentodontaceae
Opiliaceae
Grubbiaceae
Santalaceae
Misodendraceae
subordo Loranthineae
Loranthaceae

ordo Balanophorales
Balanophoraceae

ordo Medusandrales
Medusandraceae

ordo Polygonales
Polygonaceae

ordo Centrospermae
subordo Phytolaccineae
Phytolaccaceae
Gyrostemonaceae
Achatocarpaceae
Nyctaginaceae
Molluginaceae
Aizoaceae
subordo Portulacineae
Portulacaceae
Basellaceae
subordo Caryophyllineae
Caryophyllaceae
subordo Chenopodiineae
Dysphaniaceae
Chenopodiaceae
Amaranthaceae
incertae sedis
Didiereaceae

ordo Cactales
Cactaceae

ordo Magnoliales
Magnoliaceae
Degeneriaceae
Himantandraceae
Winteraceae
Annonaceae
Eupomatiaceae
Myristicaceae
Canellaceae
Schisandraceae
Illiciaceae
Austrobaileyaceae
Trimeniaceae
Amborellaceae
Monimiaceae
Calycanthaceae
Gomortegaceae
Lauraceae
Hernandiaceae
Tetracentraceae
Trochodendraceae
Eupteleaceae
Cercidiphyllaceae

ordo Ranunculales
subordo Ranunculineae
Ranunculaceae
Berberidaceae
Sargentodoxaceae
Lardizabalaceae
Menispermaceae
subordo Nymphaeineae
Nymphaeaceae
Ceratophyllaceae

ordo Piperales
Saururaceae
Piperaceae
Chloranthaceae
Lactoridaceae

ordo Aristolochiales
Aristolochiaceae
Rafflesiaceae
Hydnoraceae

ordo Guttiferales
subordo Dilleniineae
Dilleniaceae
Paeoniaceae
Crossosomataceae
Medusagynaceae
Actinidiaceae
Eucryphiaceae
subordo Ochnineae
Ochnaceae
Dioncophyllaceae
Strasburgeriaceae
Dipterocarpaceae
subordo Theineae
Theaceae
Caryocaraceae
Marcgraviaceae
Quiinaceae
Guttiferae or Clusiaceae
subordo Ancistrocladineae
Ancistrocladaceae

ordo Sarraceniales
Sarraceniaceae
Nepenthaceae
Droseraceae

ordo Papaverales
subordo Papaverineae
Papaveraceae
subordo Capparineae
Capparaceae
Cruciferae or Brassicaceae
Tovariaceae
 subordo Resedineae
Resedaceae
subordo Moringineae
Moringaceae

ordo Batales
Bataceae

ordo Rosales
subordo Hamamelidineae
Platanaceae
Hamamelidaceae
Myrothamnaceae
subordo Saxifragineae
Crassulaceae
Cephalotaceae
Saxifragaceae
Brunelliaceae
Cunoniaceae
Davidsoniaceae
Pittosporaceae
Byblidaceae
Roridulaceae
Bruniaceae
subordo Rosineae
Rosaceae
Neuradaceae
Chrysobalanaceae
subordo Leguminosineae
Connaraceae
Leguminosae or Fabaceae
Krameriaceae

ordo Hydrostachyales
Hydrostachyaceae

ordo Podostemales
Podostemaceae

ordo Geraniales
subordo Limnanthineae
Limnanthaceae
subordo Geraniineae
Oxalidaceae
Geraniaceae
Tropaeolaceae
Zygophyllaceae
Linaceae
Erythroxylaceae
subordo Euphorbiineae
Euphorbiaceae
Daphniphyllaceae

ordo Rutales
subordo Rutineae
Rutaceae
Cneoraceae
Simaroubaceae
Picrodendraceae
Burseraceae
Meliaceae
subordo Malpighiineae
Malpighiaceae
Trigoniaceae
Vochysiaceae
subordo Polygalineae
Tremandraceae
Polygalaceae

ordo Sapindales
subordo Coriariineae
Coriariaceae
subordo Anacardiineae
Anacardiaceae
subordo Sapindineae
Aceraceae
Bretschneideraceae
Sapindaceae
Hippocastanaceae
Sabiaceae
Melianthaceae
Aextoxicaceae
subordo Balsamineae
Balsaminaceae

ordo Julianiales
Julianiaceae

ordo Celastrales
subordo Celastrineae
Cyrillaceae
Pentaphylacaceae
Aquifoliaceae
Corynocarpaceae
Pandaceae
Celastraceae
Staphyleaceae
Hippocrateaceae
Stackhousiaceae
Salvadoraceae
subordo Buxineae
Buxaceae
subordo Icacinineae
Icacinaceae
Cardiopteridaceae

ordo Rhamnales
Rhamnaceae
Vitaceae
Leeaceae

ordo Malvales
subordo Elaeocarpineae
Elaeocarpaceae
subordo Sarcolaenineae
Sarcolaenaceae
subordo Malvineae
Tiliaceae
Malvaceae
Bombacaceae
Sterculiaceae
subordo Scytopetalineae
Scytopetalaceae

ordo Thymelaeales
Family Geissolomataceae
Monotypic. It consists of genus Geissoloma Lindl. ex Kunth, and species Geissoloma marginatum, from Cape, South Africa.
Family Penaeaceae from South Africa.
Tribe Endonemeae
Endonema A.Juss.
Glischrocolla (Endl.) A.DC.
Tribe Penaeeae
Brachysiphon A.Juss.
Penaea L.
Saltera Bullock (syn.:Sarcocolla Kunth)
Note: Sonderothamnus R.Dahlgren, 1968 is posterior to the publication of this work, and Stylapterus A.Juss. was included by G. Bentham & J.D. Hooker in Penaea.
Family Dichapetalaceae
Dichapetalum Thouars
Gonypetalum Ule (currently syn. of Tapura)
Stephanopodium Poepp.
Tapura Aubl.
Family Thymelaeaceae
Note: the classification of Thymelaeaceae was based on Domke 1934.
Subfamily Gonystyloideae (Syn.:Gonystylaceae)
Aetoxilon
Amyxa
Gonystylus
Subfamily Aquilarioideae
Tribe Microsemmateae
Tribe Solmsieae
Tribe Octolepideae
Tribe Aquilarieae
Subfamily Gilgiodaphnoideae (or Synandrodaphnoideae)
Monotypic. It consists of genus Gilgiodaphne (currently synonym of Synandrodaphne Gilg), and species Gilgiodaphne paradoxa, syn. of Synandrodaphne paradoxa, from West Africa.
Subfamily Thymelaeoideae
Tribe Dicranolepideae
Tribe Phalerieae
Tribe Daphneae
Tribe Thymelaeeae (Syn.:Gnidieae)
Family Elaeagnaceae
Elaeagnus
Hippophae
Shepherdia

ordo Violales
subordo Flacourtiineae
Flacourtiaceae
Peridiscaceae
Violaceae
Stachyuraceae
Scyphostegiaceae
Turneraceae
Malesherbiaceae
Passifloraceae
Achariaceae
subordo Cistineae
Cistaceae
Bixaceae
Sphaerosepalaceae
Cochlospermaceae
subordo Tamaricineae
Tamaricaceae
Frankeniaceae
Elatinaceae
subordo Caricineae
Caricaceae
subordo Loasineae
Loasaceae
subordo Begoniineae
Datiscaceae
Begoniaceae

ordo Cucurbitales
Cucurbitaceae

ordo Myrtiflorae
subordo Myrtineae
Lythraceae
Trapaceae
Crypteroniaceae
Myrtaceae
Dialypetalanthaceae
Sonneratiaceae
Punicaceae
Lecythidaceae
Melastomataceae
Rhizophoraceae
Combretaceae
Onagraceae
Oliniaceae
Haloragaceae
Theligonaceae
subordo Hippuridineae
Hippuridaceae
subordo Cynomoriineae
 Cynomoriaceae

ordo Umbelliflorae
Alangiaceae
Nyssaceae
Davidiaceae
Cornaceae
Garryaceae
Araliaceae
Umbelliferae or Apiaceae

subclassis Sympetalae

ordo Diapensiales
Diapensiaceae

ordo Ericales
Clethraceae
Pyrolaceae
Ericaceae
Empetraceae
Epacridaceae

ordo Primulales
Theophrastaceae
Myrsinaceae
Primulaceae

ordo Plumbaginales
Plumbaginaceae

ordo Ebenales
subordo Sapotineae
Sapotaceae
Sarcospermataceae
subordo Ebenineae
Ebenaceae
Styracaceae
Lissocarpaceae
Symplocaceae
Hoplestigmataceae

ordo Oleales
Oleaceae

ordo Gentianales
Loganiaceae
Desfontainiaceae
Gentianaceae
Menyanthaceae
Apocynaceae
Asclepiadaceae
Rubiaceae

ordo Tubiflorae
subordo Convolvulineae
Polemoniaceae
Fouquieriaceae
Convolvulaceae
subordo Boraginineae
Hydrophyllaceae
Boraginaceae
Lennoaceae
subordo Verbenineae
Verbenaceae
Callitrichaceae
Labiatae or Lamiaceae
subordo Solanineae
Nolanaceae
Solanaceae
Duckeodendraceae
Buddlejaceae
Scrophulariaceae
Globulariaceae
Bignoniaceae
Henriqueziaceae
Acanthaceae
Pedaliaceae
Martyniaceae
Gesneriaceae
Columelliaceae
Orobanchaceae
Lentibulariaceae
subordo Myoporineae
Myoporaceae
subordo Phrymineae
Phrymaceae

ordo Plantaginales
Plantaginaceae

ordo Dipsacales
Caprifoliaceae
Adoxaceae
Valerianaceae
Dipsacaceae

ordo Campanulales
Campanulaceae
Sphenocleaceae
Pentaphragmataceae
Goodeniaceae
Brunoniaceae
Stylidiaceae
Calyceraceae
Compositae or Asteraceae

References

Bibliography 
 
 
 I. Band: Allgemeiner Teil. Bakterien bis Gymnospermen. 
 II. Band: Angiospermen. 

system, Melchior